"De pata negra" (which can be translated as "The Real McCoy") is a song by Spanish singer Melody. It was the second single taken from her debut album De pata negra and her second single overall. She released it in 2001, at the age of 10.

The song debuted at number 18 in Spain for the week of 15 September 2001, peaking at number 12 three weeks later.

Track listing

Charts

References

External links 
 

2001 songs
2001 singles
Melody (Spanish singer) songs
Epic Records singles